This is a list of fellows of the Royal Society elected in 1682.

Fellows 
Conrad Van Beuningen  (1622–1693)
Edward Paget  (1652–1703)
Giuseppe de Faria  (d. 1703)
Sir John Chardin  (1643–1712)
Robert Pitt  (1653–1713)
John Turnor  (1660–1719)
Walter Mills  (1654–1726)
Marcantonio Borghese Principe di Sulmona e Rossano (1660–1729)
Muhammad ibn Haddu  (fl. 1682)

References

1682
1682 in science
1682 in England